Lamyra is a genus of robber flies in the family Asilidae. There are at least 30 described species in Lamyra.

Species
These 39 species belong to the genus Lamyra:

 Lamyra amurensis (Hermann, 1914) c g
 Lamyra antipai Weinberg & Parvu, 1999 c g
 Lamyra asprospilos Young & Hradsky, 2007 c g
 Lamyra castellanii (Hradsky, 1962) c g
 Lamyra caucasicus Richter, 1971 c g
 Lamyra caudatus Lehr, 1991 c g
 Lamyra dimidiata (Loew, 1847) c g
 Lamyra dioctriaeformis (Meigen, 1820) c g
 Lamyra fmbriata (Meigen, 1820) c g
 Lamyra fortunatus Baez & Weinberg, 1981 c g
 Lamyra fuliginosa (Panzer, 1798) c g
 Lamyra fulva (Meigen, 1804) c g
 Lamyra greatheadi Oldroyd, 1974 c g
 Lamyra gulo (Loew, 1851) c g
 Lamyra hamardabanica Lehr, 1991 c g
 Lamyra ignea (Meigen, 1820) c g
 Lamyra isshikii (Matsumura, 1916) c g
 Lamyra komure (Matsumura, 1911) c g
 Lamyra lapponica (Zetterstedt, 1838) c g
 Lamyra loewi (Lehr, 1991) c g
 Lamyra marginata (Linnaeus, 1758) c g
 Lamyra montanus Lehr, 1977 c g
 Lamyra mouchai Hradsky, 1985 c g
 Lamyra nigrovittata (Matsumura, 1916) c g
 Lamyra nikolaevi Lehr, 1977 c g
 Lamyra nobilis (Walker, 1871) c g
 Lamyra perrara Lehr, 1991 c g
 Lamyra pleskei Becker & Stein, 1913 c g
 Lamyra potanini Lehr, 1991 c g
 Lamyra rossi Oldroyd, 1974 c g
 Lamyra rufipes (Fallen, 1814) c g
 Lamyra scelestus Richter, 1974 c g
 Lamyra steinbergi Richter, 1964 c g
 Lamyra taiga Lehr, 1991 c g
 Lamyra tenebrosus Esipenko, 1974 c g
 Lamyra ursula (Loew, 1851) c g
 Lamyra vorax Loew, 1858 c g
 Lamyra xanthotrix (Hermann, 1914) c g
 Lamyra yaeyamana Haupt & Azuma, 1998 c g

Data sources: i = ITIS, c = Catalogue of Life, g = GBIF, b = Bugguide.net

References

Further reading

External links

 
 

Asilidae genera
Laphriinae